The 1996–97 Scottish Premier Division season was the penultimate season of Scottish Premier Division football before the change to the Scottish Premier League. It began on 10 August 1996.

Overview
The 1996–97 Scottish Premier Division season ended in success for Rangers who won the title by five points from nearest rivals Celtic to clinch nine titles in a row, equalling Celtic's record from the 1973–74 season. Raith Rovers were relegated to the First Division after finishing bottom. As champions, Rangers qualified for the Champions League while Celtic were joined by third-placed Dundee United in qualifying for the UEFA Cup. Seventh-placed Kilmarnock qualified for the penultimate Cup Winners' Cup as Scottish Cup winners.

The season began on 10 August with the first goal of the season scored by Dundee United's Gary McSwegan as they drew 1–1 at home to Motherwell. The season ended on 10 May with Celtic's Tommy Johnson netting a late goal to cap a 3–0 win at home to Dundee United to claim the final goal of the season.

Clubs

Promotion and relegation from 1995–96
Promoted from First Division to Premier League
Dunfermline Athletic
Dundee United (via play-off)

Relegated from Premier Division to First Division
Partick Thistle (via play-off)
Falkirk

Stadia and locations

Managers

Managerial changes

Events
 17 August: Ally McCoist hits the first hat-trick of the season in a 5–2 win at Dunfermline.
 7 May: Rangers win the title with a 1–0 win at Dundee United

League table

Results

Matches 1–18
During matches 1–18 each team plays every other team twice (home and away).

Matches 19–36
During matches 19–36 each team plays every other team a further two times (home and away).

Play-off
A two leg play-off took place between the 9th placed team in the Premier Division (Hibernian) and the runner-up of the First Division (Airdrieonians) for a place in the 1997–98 Scottish Premier Division.

Hibernian won the first leg 1–0 at Easter Road, and went on to win the second leg by 4 goals to 2 at Broadwood Stadium. Therefore, Hibernian maintained their Premier Division status for another season, 5–2 on aggregate.

Top scorers

Source: Soccerbot

References

Scottish Premier Division seasons
Scot
1996–97 Scottish Football League